Lype diversa is a species of net tube caddisfly in the family Psychomyiidae. It is found in North America.

References

Trichoptera
Articles created by Qbugbot
Insects described in 1914